Tinúm Municipality (Yucatec Maya: "crippled numtzutzuy") is one of the 106 municipalities in the Mexican state of Yucatán containing of land and is located roughly  east of the city of Mérida.

History
There is no accurate data on when the town was founded, but it was a settlement before the conquest and was located in the chieftainship of  Cupules. Within the municipality is Chichen Itza, a city built in the Post Classic Maya period, which reached its apex between the 11th and 12th centuries.

After colonization by the Spanish, the area became part of the encomienda system with various encomenderos, beginning with Juan García de Llanos in 1549 and passing to the crown in 1551. In 1607, it passed to Baltasar Pacheco Dorantes.

Yucatán declared its independence from the Spanish Crown in 1821. In 1825 the Mexican government assigned this community to the Valladolid Municipality. In 1918 Tinúm was designated as an independent municipality.

Governance
The municipal president is elected for a three-year term. The town council has seven councilpersons, who serve as Secretary and councilors of public works, police commissaries, education, ecology, public monuments and sports.

Communities
The seat of the municipality is Tinúm. The municipality has 37 populated places besides the seat, including Balantún, Chichén Itzá, Chichil, Dzulotok, Macuchén, Pisté, San Francisco, San Felipe, San Felipe Nuevo, San José, San Nicolás, Santa María, Tohopkú, and X-Calakoop. The significant populations are shown below:

Local festivals
Every year on 12 June, the town celebrates the feast of Saint Anthony of Padua, its patron saint.

Tourist attractions
 Church of Saint Anthony of Padua, built during the colonial era
 Church of Conception, built during the colonial era
 archeological sites at Bacancú, Canahum, Chichen Itza, Dzibiac, Halacal, Joya de Erik Thompson, Pisté, San Francisco Semé, San Juan Holtún, Tikincab, La Venta and Xnabá.
 Sacred Cenote
 Hacienda Chichén

Notes

References

Municipalities of Yucatán